Sambhavami Yuge Yuge is a 1972 Indian Malayalam-language film, directed by A. B. Raj and produced by K. P. Kottarakkara. The film stars Prem Nazir, Adoor Bhasi, Jose Prakash and Prameela in the lead roles. The film's musical score was composed by M. S. Baburaj.

Cast 

Prem Nazir as Vasu
Adoor Bhasi as Velu
K. P. Ummer as Raju 
Jose Prakash as Balan
Prameela
Sankaradi as jeweler Nagappan Nair
T. S. Muthaiah
Adoor Bhavani as Kalyani Amma
Khadeeja
N. Govindankutty
Sadhana as Meena
Vijayasree as Sumathi
Kunchan

Soundtrack 
The music was composed by M. S. Baburaj and the lyrics were written by Sreekumaran Thampi.

References

External links 
 

1972 films
1970s Malayalam-language films
Films scored by M. S. Baburaj